Shattuck Hotel is a historic building that was built as a hotel, located on the corner of Shattuck Avenue and Allston Way in Downtown Berkeley. Opened in December 1910 with the consent of Rosa Shattuck, wife of prominent gold seeker and builder Francis K. Shattuck, the hotel is located near the site of Rosa and Francis Shattuck's former Victorian estate. It has been a City of Berkeley landmark since 1987. It has also been operated as the Whitecotton Hotel and is currently operated as the Hotel Shattuck Plaza.

Architectural style
Built by architect Benjamin McDougall, who is also credited with creating the Berkeley YMCA building, the building was built in the Mission Revival Style that is apparent in its square corner turrets and arched windows.
The building was made from reinforced steel and concrete and when built, was purported to be fire-proof. Upon construction, furnishings were supplied by the W. & J. Sloane of San Francisco. 

In 1914, an annex was added to accommodate the crowd expected for the Panama Pacific International Exposition in San Francisco. In 1926 a covered arcade was built on the ground floor of the annex. The construction tripled the size of the original six-story building, adding 120 rooms for a total of 300. Renovations in 2007 have also included more modern architectural forms.

Ownership
After the death of Rosa Shattuck in 1908, the Shattuck estate was deeded to her niece Rosa Livingstone Woolsey as part of her inheritance. In 1910  W.E. Woolsey, Rosa Livingstone's husband, was cited as hotel's owner with Noah W. Gray as manager.

From 1918–1942, the hotel was known as the Whitecotton Hotel in honor of its owner, William Whitecotton. In 1926, Whitecotton leased the hotel to Whitecotton Realty Company which reorganized in 1934 into the Shattuck Properties Corporations. Levi Strauss Realty Co., bought the hotel from the Shattuck Properties Corporation in 1941 and leased it to Durant Hotel owners Wallace and Joan Miller. In 1942 the Millers renamed the hotel back to Shattuck Hotel and moved the entrance from Shattuck Avenue to Allston Way. The J.F. Hink and Son Department Store occupied the ground floor space of the annex for over seventy years.

In 2007 the hotel was purchased by BPR Properties and renamed to Hotel Shattuck Plaza.

References

External links
Hotel Shattuck Plaza Website

Buildings and structures in Berkeley, California
Hotels in the San Francisco Bay Area
Residential buildings in Alameda County, California
Economy of Berkeley, California
Hotels established in 1910
Hotel buildings completed in 1910
1910 establishments in California
Mission Revival architecture in California